Episode Five, Episode 5 or Episode V may refer to:

The Empire Strikes Back also known as Star Wars: Episode V – The Empire Strikes Back, a 1980 film
Episode 5 (Humans series 1)
Episode 5 (Primeval)
Episode 5 (Silverwing)
Episode 5 (Ashes to Ashes)
Episode 5 (Peep Show)
Episode 5 (Skins)